Tsing Yi Pier or Tsing Yi Ferry Terminus was a ferry pier on Tsing Yi Island, Hong Kong. It replaced Tsing Yi Town old pier that was buried during land reclamation. There were ferries to Tsuen Wan and Central. The service ceased to exist and the pier was free for public use thereafter.

Location
The pier is on the east seafront of reclaimed land of Tsing Yi Bay, near Tsing Leng Tsui, facing Rambler Channel. Three housing estates Greenfield Garden, Grand Horizon and Serene Garden are very close to it.

References

Tsing Yi
Piers in Hong Kong